DXRJ can refer to two radio stations in the Philippines:

 DXRJ-AM in Iligan City
 DXRJ-FM in Cagayan De Oro

Not to be confused with:

DZRJ-AM AM radio 810 kHz
DZRJ-FM 100.3 MHz, branded on-air as RJ 100.3
DZRJ-TV television, channel 29